The  is a railway line operated by the  private railway company Hanshin Electric Railway in Japan.

Outline
The Main Line of Hanshin is the southernmost railway to connect Osaka and Kobe. The other two lines, from south to north, are the West Japan Railway Company‘s Tōkaidō Main Line (known as the JR Kobe Line), and the Hankyu Railway's Kobe Main Line.

For nearly a century, the line served as a primary competitor to the Hankyū Kobe Line. However, in 2006, Hanshin and Hankyū were subsidiarized under a single share holding company, Hankyu Hanshin Holdings.

History
The Main Line started operation on April 12, 1905, by the company. The company found a solution to construct a competing line to the then JNR owned Kobe Line using a loophole in the Tram Act, allowing large portions of the line to be built using street running. It became the first interurban in Japan. This inspired other railways such as Keihan Electric Railway, Minoo Arima Electric Tramway (present Hankyu Hanshin Holdings, Inc.), Osaka Electric Tramway (present Kintetsu), Keihin Electric Railway (present Keihin Electric Express Railway) to built their first lines in a similar fashion.

Then another competing railway company, Hankyū (then Hanshin Kyuko Railway), opened the Kobe Main Line in 1920. The Kobe Main Line was designed as a faster electric mainline railway, and in response Hanshin began upgrading its interurban mainline to become more railway like. Operations included realigning and grade separating street running portions, using high platforms, and introducing express trains.

Former connecting lines
 Deyashiki station - The Hanshin Amagasaki Kaigan Line operated between 1929 and 1962.

Operation
Some trains run through the Sanyō Railway Main Line to Sanyō Himeji Station in Himeji, Hyōgo beyond Motomachi terminal via Kobe Rapid Railway.

The Main Line operates eight types of trains, one of the most types among Japanese railways. This is in some part to equalize the load of each train especially in the morning for Osaka (Umeda station) with short length of EMU length and with few (only double) tracks.  For the extension of the Hanshin Namba Line, from Nishikujo to Osaka Namba, on March 20, 2009, the diagrams of the Hanshin Railway were revised.

Abbreviations are tentative for this article.

Trains stop all stations, farthest down to Shinkaichi in the rush hour, and Kosoku Kobe in the off-peak hour.

Trains are operated between Osaka-Umeda and Nishinomiya or between Osaka Umeda and Amagasaki. In addition, 1 midnight train is operated to Mikage with limited express stops.

Trains are operated between Kōshien and Osaka-Umeda in weekday morning rush hours. In addition, 2 trains are operated from Ogi to Osaka-Umeda. In official route maps Hanshin shortens the name to "Express".

Trains are through trains to and from the Hanshin Namba Line and the Kintetsu Nara Line. They also stop at Mukogawa and Imazu Stations in the off-peak hour on weekdays, all day on weekends and holidays, but pass Ashiya Station on weekends and holidays. In addition to trains returning at Kobe-Sannomiya every day, there are also 3 trains from Shinkaichi on the Kobe Kosoku Line to Kintetsu Nara on weekends and Holidays.

Trains are operated down to Sumaura-kōen in the day and late night on weekdays and after day hours on holidays. In official route maps Hanshin shortens the name to "Limited Express".

Trains are operated between Osaka-Umeda and Sanyō Himeji. Trains marking in yellow in the destination sign stop at Nishi-Motomachi, Daikai and Nishidai Stations on the Kobe Kosoku Line. 7 eastbound trains pass Koshien in the morning on weekdays. In official route maps Hanshin shortens the name to "Limited Express".

Trains are operated only from Mikage to Osaka-Umeda in weekday morning rush hours with connections from Osaka-Umeda-bound local trains at Mikage. In official route maps Hanshin shortens the name to "Limited Express".

Stations 
The Main Line, having 39 stations (including the Kobe Kosoku Line), is noted for its "high density" of stations. In comparison, Kobe-Sannomiya Station is the 16th station on the Hankyū Kobe Main Line from Umeda Station and Motomachi Station is the 15th station on the JR Kobe Line from Osaka Station.

For connections and distances, see the route diagram.

● : All trains stop
▲ : Some trains stop, depending on time of day and the particular service
◆ : Served by weekend eastbound rapid express services only
△ : Extra services stop
｜ ↓ ↑: All trains pass (Arrows indicate directions)

References

 
Rail transport in Osaka Prefecture
Rail transport in Hyōgo Prefecture
Standard gauge railways in Japan
Railway lines opened in 1905
1905 establishments in Japan